Mika "Bana" Lehkosuo (born 8 January 1970) is a Finnish football manager and former midfielder, and working as a coach for Finland national team.

Playing career
Lehkosuo played most of his career at HJK Helsinki. He was not a very prominent youth player and made his top division debut in 1993 after spending three years with lower division club Vantaan Pallo. He did not make his breakthrough into the HJK senior squad until 1995, when he made 24 league appearances and scored one goal. In the previous season he had even played one league match for FF Jaro.

In the following seasons Lehkosuo received more and more responsibilities and became one of the best midfielders in the Veikkausliiga. In the end of the 1990s he formed the successful midfield trio with Aki Riihilahti and Jarkko Wiss with whom he won the league title in 1997 and worked their way to the group stage of UEFA Champions League in the next season.

A sponsorship deal with a local radio station meant that Lehkuosuo wore the unusual shirt number 96.2 for a period at HJK Helsinki. This deal ended when he was forbidden to wear the number in UEFA Champions League matches. Lehkuosuo captained HJK in the group stage of the Champions League that season, helping HJK become the first ever Finnish team to earn that distinction.

In the winter of 1998 Lehkosuo was signed on loan by Italian Serie A side Perugia. He only played eleven games in Italy and returned to HJK for the next Veikkausliiga season. In 1999 and 2000 Lehkosuo was made the captain of the HJK squad and he played in a more attacking role. However, in August 2000 Lehkosuo injured his knee ligament. The knee didn't fully recover and Lehkosuo was forced to end his playing career in 2002 after playing 190 matches in Veikkausliiga, of which he played 189 for HJK.

International career
Lehkosuo played 17 matches for the Finnish national team and scored one goal.

Managerial career
Lehkosuo started his managerial career with HJK youth teams quickly after retiring as a player. In 2005, he was appointed as assistant manager of Ville Lyytikäinen of Ykkönen (the second tier) side FC Honka. After Lyytikäinen was sacked, Lehkosuo became head coach. He guided the team to the top place of Ykkönen. In the first season in the Veikkausliiga Lehkosuo guided his team to a fourth-place finish. In 2007 Honka was again fourth. In 2008 Lehkosuo guided Honka to second place and to the UEFA Cup qualifications for the next season. In 2009 Honka was again second in the league table. Lehkosuo managed Honka until February 2014.

On 29 April 2014, Lehkosuo was appointed as the manager of HJK after Sixten Boström was sacked. He led HJK into the Europa League group stages in 2014 with a 5–4 aggregate victory over SK Rapid Wien in the play-off round. After winning three Veikkausliiga titles and two Finnish Cups, he left the club in May 2019.

Lehkosuo was appointed head coach of Norwegian club Kongsvinger in December 2019.  He was sacked in September 2020 after Kongsvinger picked up only 13 points from 18 games.

Personal life
Lehkosuo graduated as a Master of Science in Technology from Helsinki University of Technology in 2003.

Honours

As a player
HJK
Veikkausliiga: 1997, 2002
Finnish Cup: 1996, 1998, 2000
Finnish League Cup: 1996, 1997, 1998

Individual
HJK Hall of Fame Inductee

As a manager
FC Honka
Finnish Cup: 2012
Finnish League Cup: 2010, 2011
Ykkönen: 2005

HJK
Veikkausliiga: 2014, 2017, 2018
Finnish Cup: 2014, 2016–17
Finnish League Cup: 2015

References

 https://web.archive.org/web/20110720194121/http://www.urheiluarkisto.fi/portals/44/veikkausliiga20v/pelaajat/lehkosuo.htm
 https://archive.today/20100514124031/http://www.fchonka.fi/joukkue/group/10b6b4d8fec511dba79a4d356af4849a849a/4d09c21e15ad11dc9ab4f92f934831e431e4/

1970 births
Living people
Finnish footballers
Finnish expatriate footballers
Finland international footballers
Finnish football managers
Association football midfielders
Veikkausliiga players
Serie A players
Helsingin Jalkapalloklubi players
FC Honka managers
Klubi 04 players
A.C. Perugia Calcio players
Expatriate footballers in Italy
Finnish expatriate sportspeople in Italy
Veikkausliiga managers
Helsingin Jalkapalloklubi managers
Finnish expatriate football managers
Expatriate football managers in Norway
Finnish expatriate sportspeople in Norway
Kongsvinger IL Toppfotball managers
Footballers from Helsinki